The 1965 NAIA men's basketball tournament was held in March at Municipal Auditorium in Kansas City, Missouri. The 28th annual NAIA basketball tournament featured 32 teams playing in a single-elimination format. This is the first tournament since 1947 tournament to feature four new teams to the NAIA Semifinals. (It would be the 4th time since 1937 this has happened; previous years were the inaugural year 1937, 1945, and 1947). It was the longest gap up until it was eclipsed by the gap between 1969-2001 which featured 1 or more repeating semi-finalist each year. It was the second time the number one seed has won the tournament.

Awards and honors
Leading scorer: Al Tucker, Oklahoma Baptist; 5 games, 43 field goals, 39 free throws, 125 total points (25.0 average points per game)
Leading rebounder: Ken Wilburn, Central State (Ohio); 5 games, 90 total rebounds (18.0 average rebounds per game)
Player of the Year: est. 1994
All-time leading scorer; first appearance: Al Tucker 2nd, Oklahoma Baptist (1965,66,67); 15 games, 177 field goals, 117 free throws, 471 total points (31.4 points per game).

1965 NAIA bracket

  * denotes overtime.

Third-place game
The third-place game featured the losing teams from the national semifinalist to determine 3rd and 4th places in the tournament. This game was played until 1988.

See also
 1965 NCAA University Division basketball tournament
 1965 NCAA College Division basketball tournament

References

NAIA Men's Basketball Championship
Tournament
NAIA men's basketball tournament
NAIA men's basketball tournament
College basketball tournaments in Missouri
Basketball competitions in Kansas City, Missouri